All the World to Nothing is a 1918 American silent comedy-drama film directed by Henry King and starring William Russell, Winifred Westover, and J. Morris Foster. As noted in an advertisement, it was based on the novel of the same name by Wyndham Martyn.

Cast
 William Russell as Richard Chester 
 Winifred Westover as Nora Ellis 
 J. Morris Foster as Everard Peck 
 Hayward Mack as Charles Renalls

References

Bibliography
 Donald W. McCaffrey & Christopher P. Jacobs. Guide to the Silent Years of American Cinema. Greenwood Publishing, 1999.

External links

1918 films
1918 comedy-drama films
Films directed by Henry King
American silent feature films
1910s English-language films
Pathé Exchange films
American black-and-white films
Films based on British novels
1910s American films
Silent American comedy-drama films